Plum Lucky is a crime novel by mystery writer Janet Evanovich. It is the sixteenth part of her series dedicated to bounty hunter Stephanie Plum. It was published on January 8, 2008.

Synopsis
Diesel and Stephanie end up teaming up with a strange man who thinks he's a leprechaun in an effort to save a horse named Doug and Grandma Mazur.

Car Death
Stephanie's Monte Carlo- Lula shot it with a rocket launcher.
Lincoln Town Car belonging to Lou Delvina.

2008 novels
Stephanie Plum books
Saint Patrick's Day fiction
Holiday-themed novels